Rainer Island or Rainier Island (Остров Райнера; Ostrov Raynyera) is an island in Franz Josef Land, Russia. Lat. 81° 42' N; long 59° 00' E.

Geography

This island was named by the Austro-Hungarian North Pole Expedition after nobleman Rainer Joseph Johann Michael Franz Hieronymus, Archduke of Austria, Prince Royal of Hungary and Bohemia, also known as the Archduke Rainer of Austria, one of the aristocrats who helped to finance the private venture.

Rainer Island is part of the Zemlya Zichy subgroup of the Franz Joseph Archipelago. It is located east of Karl-Alexander Island and very close to it, separated by a  narrow sound.

Adjacent islands
At the northern end of the sound between Rainer Island and Karl-Alexander Island there is a group of islets known as Lesgaft Reefs (рифы Лесгафта). These were named after Russian social reformer Peter Lesgaft.
Close to the northeastern shore of Rainer Island there is a small islet called Ostrov Ivanova which is only  in length.

See also 
 List of islands of Russia

References

External links 
 Islands
 Historical data

Islands of Franz Josef Land
Uninhabited islands of Russia